Sociedade Desportiva Juazeirense, or simply Juazeirense, is a Brazilian professional football club based in Juazeiro, Bahia. It competes in the Série D, the fourth tier of Brazilian football, as well as in the Campeonato Baiano, the top flight of the Bahia state football league.

History
The club was founded on December 12, 2006. Juazeirense won the Campeonato Baiano Second Level in 2011, after beating Itabuna in the final.

Achievements

 Campeonato Baiano Second Level:
 Winners (1): 2011

Stadium
Sociedade Desportiva Juazeirense play their home games at Estádio Municipal Adauto Moraes. The stadium has a maximum capacity of 8,000 people.

References

 
Association football clubs established in 2006
Football clubs in Bahia
2006 establishments in Brazil
Juazeiro